This is a list of political parties in Myanmar (also known as Burma).

Parties represented in the 2016–2021 Assembly of the Union

Unrepresented parties 
 Arakan Liberation Party
 Arakan National Council
 Chin National Front
 Chin National Party
 Chin Progressive Party
 Communist Party of Burma (banned)
 Confederate Farmers Party
 Dawei Nationalities Party
 Democracy and Human Rights Party
 Democracy and Peace Party
 Democratic Party for a New Society
 Ethnic National Development Party
 Federal Union Party
 Inn National Development Party
 Kachin Independence Organization (banned)
 Karen National Party
 Karen National Union
 Karenni National Progressive Party
 Kaman National Progressive Party
 Khami National Development Party
 Lahu Democratic Union
 Modern People's Party
 Mro National Party 
 Mro National Solidarity Organisation
 Myanmar Farmers Development Party
 National Democratic Force
 National Democratic Party for Development
 National Development Party
 National Development and Peace Party
 New Mon State Party
 Palaung State Liberation Front
 Peace and Diversity Party
 Phalon-Sawaw Democratic Party
 People's Party of Myanmar Farmers and Workers
 Regional Development Party of Pyay
 Restoration Council of Shan State
 Shan State Progress Party
 Union Democratic Party
 United Democratic Party of Myanmar
 United Kayin League
 United Wa State Party
 Wunthanu National League for Democracy

Defunct parties 
 21 Party
 All-Shan State Organisation
 Anti-Fascist Organisation
 Anti-Fascist People's Freedom League
 Anti-Separation League
 Arakan League for Democracy
 Arakanese Muslim Association
 Arakanese National Unity Organisation
 Burma Democratic Party
 Burma for the Burmans League
 Burma Muslim Congress
 Burma Nationalist Party
 Burma Socialist Party
 Burma Socialist Programme Party
 Burma Workers Party
 Chin Hills Congress
 Chin National Organisation
 Democracy Party
 Democratic Organisation for Kayan National Unity
 Freedom Bloc
 General Council of Burmese Associations
 Graduates and Old Students Democratic Association
 Hlaing-Myat-Paw GCBA
 Home Rule Party
 Independent Arakanese Parliamentary Group
 Independent Party
 Justice Party
 Kachin National Congress
 Kamans National League for Democracy
 Karen National Association
 Karen State National Organisation
 Kayah Democratic League
 Kayah National United League
 Kayah State Nationalities League for Democracy
 Mara People's Party
 Mon National Front
 Naga Hills Regional Progressive Party
 National Parliamentary Organisation
 National United Front
 Nationalist Party
 Party for National Democracy
 Patriot's Party
 Patriotic Alliance
 Patriotic Old Comrades' League
 People's Democratic Front
 People's Educational and Cultural Development Organisation
 People's Party
 People's Peace Front
 Poor Man's Party
 Rakhine Nationalities Development Party
 Separation League
 Shan State Peasants' Organisation
 Swaraj Party
 Ta'ang National League for Democracy
 Thakins
 Union Danu League for Democracy Party
 Union Karen League
 Union National Democracy Party
 Union Party
 United GCBA
 United Hill People's Congress
 United National Pa-O Organisation
 United Nationalities League for Democracy

Political organisations 
 88 Generation Students Group
 Myanmar Democracy Congress
 National Political Alliances League
 Union of Myanmar Federation of National Politics
 United Nationalities Federal Council
 Union Solidarity and Development Association

Governments in exile 
 National Coalition Government of the Union of Burma
 National Council of the Union of Burma
 National Unity Government of Myanmar

See also 

 Assembly of the Union
 Elections in Myanmar

References

External links 
 List of political parties registered for the 2015 Myanmar general election

Myanmar
 
Political parties
Myanmar